Lists of provincial governors of the Democratic Republic of the Congo are lists of governors of the provinces of the Democratic Republic of the Congo and its predecessors (Zaire, Republic of the Congo, Belgian Congo). It includes equivalent positions such as President or Commissioner.
The provinces have gone through a series of changes since they were first established in 1919, sometimes being split up, and sometimes recombined. See  for a tabular view of the evolution.

Most of the lists are historical, up to the reorganization of 2015, when the 11 provinces, including Kinshasa, were split into the present 26. See the articles on the present provinces for lists of governors from that date.

Lists of governors

See also 
List of provincial governors of the Democratic Republic of the Congo